Badass was first trademarked by Leo Quan, a manufacturer of bridges for guitars and basses. Badass bridges (used on the Martin EB18 electric bass and a replacement bridge on the Fender Precision Bass) feature individually adjustable saddles, which allows for "extremely accurate intonation adjustments."
The Badass came on the market in the 1970s, and was made by entrepreneur and guitar repairman Glen Quan, of Marin County music store Bananas At Large and Leo Malliaris of Oakland's Leo's Music (hence Leo Quan). The first Badass bridges were built from diecast zinc and were considered somewhat rough; later models were made from a high-density zinc alloy and more finely milled.  Badass is currently owned and distributed by Allparts Music, a subsidiary of Morse Group.

Notable users and models
Frank Bello (Anthrax) on his Fender signature bass.
Mike Dirnt (Green Day), Badass II on a Fender Precision Bass made in the Fender Custom Shop, the source of the signature Mike Dirnt Precision Bass.
Steve Harris (Iron Maiden), Badass II bridge on his Fender Precision Bass.
Kirk Hammett (Metallica, formerly Exodus), on his 1974 Gibson Flying V.
Geddy Lee (Rush); the 1998 "Geddy Lee Limited Edition" Fender Jazz Bass is equipped with a Badass II, also his Jetglo Rickenbacker 4001 with a Badass I.
Marcus Miller, on a Fender Jazz Bass.
Jimmy Page (Led Zeppelin), on his Danelectro.
Malcolm Young (AC/DC); the Gretsch "Malcolm Young Series" was equipped with a Badass bridge, based on Young's customized early 1960s Gretsch Jet Firebird.
Jerry Only (Misfits); on his "devastator" bass.
Juan Alderete (The Mars Volta, Racer X), on his Fender Precision Bass.
David Ellefson (Megadeth); David's Jackson signature bass model has a Badass II bridge.
Sting (The Police) on his Spector NS-2 bass.
Nate Mendel (Foo Fighters) uses a Badass II on his signature Fender Precision Bass model.
Dan Andriano (Alkaline Trio, The Damned Things) uses Badass II bridges on many of his Fender Precision and Jazz Basses.
Flea (Red Hot Chili Peppers) used a Badass II on his Modulus Basses.
C.J. Ramone on his Fender Dee Dee Ramone Precision Basses.

References

Guitar bridges
String instrument construction